Score Entertainment was a trading card design and manufacturing company based in Arlington, Texas.  Their first card game was the Dragon Ball Z: Collectible Card Game in 2000.  Score Entertainment was a member of the Donruss Playoff LP family of companies. Donruss Playoff LP was bought out in early 2009 by Panini America and Score Entertainment was closed down.

Trading cards and games
As with several other companies in the trading card and collectible card game industries, Score Entertainment licensed popular intellectual properties for their games and trading cards.  These are drawn from a variety of television programs, animated series, and video games.  Their game properties included the following:

 Bleach Trading Card Game
 Buffy the Vampire Slayer Collectible Card Game
 Case Closed Trading Card Game
 Dragon Ball GT Trading Card Game
 Dragon Ball Z Collectible Card Game
 Dragon Ball Z Trading Card Game
 Dragon Booster Trading Card Game
 Fruits Basket: Friends of the Zodiac Card Game
 InuYasha Trading Card Game
 Sonic X Trading Card Game
 Yu Yu Hakusho Trading Card Game

The company was also responsible for the Epic Battles Trading Card Game, as well as the newer Afterworld game.

External links
 Panini America (successor)

Companies established in 2000
Collectible card games